

Canadian Football News in 1950
The Hamilton Tigers and the Hamilton Wildcats merged to form the Hamilton Tiger-Cats. The Regina franchise officially changed their name to become the Saskatchewan Roughriders on Saturday, April 1.

The WIFU allowed the third place team in the standings to be qualified for a playoff berth. The first professional playoff game was played at night under lights – Winnipeg Blue Bombers and the Edmonton Eskimos. The 38th Grey Cup, nicknamed "The Mud Bowl", was held at Toronto's Varsity Stadium with an attendance of 27,101.

Regular season

Final regular season standings
Note: GP = Games Played, W = Wins, L = Losses, T = Ties, PF = Points For, PA = Points Against, Pts = Points

Bold text means that they have clinched the playoffs.
Winnipeg gets a bye and will play in the WIFU Finals.

Grey Cup playoffs
Note: All dates in 1950

Semifinals

The Edmonton Eskimos will play the Winnipeg Blue Bombers in the WIFU Finals.

Finals

 Winnipeg won the total-point series by 67–35. The Blue Bombers will advance to the Grey Cup game.

 Toronto won the total-point series by 35–21. The Balmy Beach Beachers will play the Toronto Argonauts in the Eastern finals.

 Toronto won the total-point series by 35–19. The Argonauts will play the Toronto Balmy Beach Beachers in the Eastern finals.

Eastern Finals

 The Toronto Argonauts will advance to the Grey Cup game.

Playoff bracket

Grey Cup Championship

The Argonauts defeated Winnipeg in what is now known simply as the ‘Mud Bowl’.

1950 Eastern (Combined IRFU & ORFU) All-Stars
NOTE: During this time most players played both ways, so the All-Star selections do not distinguish between some offensive and defensive positions.
1st Team
QB – Frank Filchock, Montreal Alouettes
HB – Ulysses Curtis, Toronto Argonauts
HB – Bill Gregus, Hamilton Tiger-Cats
HB – Edgar Jones, Hamilton Tiger-Cats
E  – Vince Mazza, Hamilton Tiger-Cats
E  – Bill Stanton, Ottawa Rough Riders
FW – Rod Pantages, Montreal Alouettes
C  – Ed Hirsch, Toronto Argonauts
G  – Ray Cicia, Montreal Alouettes
G  – Vince Scott, Hamilton Tiger-Cats
T  – Herb Trawick, Montreal Alouettes
T  – Ralph Sazio, Hamilton Tiger-Cats2nd Team
QB – Al Dekdebrun, Toronto Argonauts
HB – Carl Galbreath, Toronto Balmy Beach Beachers
HB – Virgil Wagner, Montreal Alouettes
HB – Bob McFarlane, University of Western Ontario
E  – Keith Fisher, Sarnia Imperials
E  – Ralph Toohy, Montreal Alouettes
FW – Johnny Chorostecki, Sarnia Imperials
C  – Dwight Follin, Toronto Balmy Beach Beachers
G  – Fred Black, Toronto Argonauts
G  – Jack Carpenter, Hamilton Tiger-Cats
G  – Bruce Mattingly, Sarnia Imperials
T  – Oatten Fisher, Toronto Balmy Beach Beachers
T  – Jack Kerns, Toronto Argonauts

1950 Western Interprovincial Football Union All-Stars
NOTE: During this time most players played both ways, so the All-Star selections do not distinguish between some offensive and defensive positions.
1st Team
QB – Jack Jacobs, Winnipeg Blue Bombers
HB – Tom Casey, Winnipeg Blue Bombers
HB – Al Bodine, Saskatchewan Roughriders
FB – Mike King, Edmonton Eskimos
E  – Joe Aguirre, Winnipeg Blue Bombers
E  – Morris Bailey, Edmonton Eskimos
FW – Bob Paffrath, Edmonton Eskimos
C  – John Brown, Winnipeg Blue Bombers
G  – Max Druen, Saskatchewan Roughriders
G  – Riley Matheson, Calgary Stampeders
T  – Glenn Johnson, Winnipeg Blue Bombers
T  – Buddy Tinsley, Winnipeg Blue Bombers2nd Team
QB – Lindy Berry, Edmonton Eskimos
HB – Del Wardien, Saskatchewan Roughriders
HB – Royal Copeland, Calgary Stampeders
HB – Harry Hood, Calgary Stampeders
FB – Ken Charlton, Saskatchewan Roughriders
E  – Ed Henke, Winnipeg Blue Bombers
E  – Rollin Prather, Edmonton Eskimos
C  – James W. Kynes, Saskatchewan Roughriders
G  – Gary Deleeuw, Winnipeg Blue Bombers
G  – Jim Quondamatteo, Edmonton Eskimos
T  – Bob Bryant, Calgary Stampeders
T  – Mike Cassidy, Saskatchewan Roughriders
T  – Don Durno, Edmonton Eskimos

1950 Ontario Rugby Football Union All-Stars
NOTE: During this time most players played both ways, so the All-Star selections do not distinguish between some offensive and defensive positions.
QB – Gerry Tuttle, Toronto Balmy Beach Beachers
HB – Carl Galbreath, Toronto Balmy Beach Beachers
HB – Johnny Chorostecki, Sarnia Imperials
DB – Jim Chaine, Windsor Rockets
E  – Andy Gilmour, Toronto Balmy Beach Beachers
E  – Keith Fisher, Sarnia Imperials
FW – Billy Haddleton, Toronto Balmy Beach Beachers
C  – Dwight Follin, Toronto Balmy Beach Beachers
G  – Bruce Mattingly, Sarnia Imperials
G  – Ross Taylor, Toronto Balmy Beach Beachers
T  – Oatten Fisher, Toronto Balmy Beach Beachers
T  – George Gilchrist, Toronto Balmy Beach Beachers

1950 Canadian Football Awards
 Jeff Russel Memorial Trophy (IRFU MVP) – Don Loney (C), Ottawa Rough Riders
 Jeff Nicklin Memorial Trophy (WIFU MVP) - Lindy Berry (QB), Edmonton Eskimos
 Gruen Trophy (IRFU Rookie of the Year) - Bob McDonald (RB), Hamilton Tiger-Cats
 Dr. Beattie Martin Trophy (WIFU Rookie of the Year) - Gordon Brown (DG), Calgary Stampeders
 Imperial Oil Trophy (ORFU MVP) - Carl Galbreath - Toronto Balmy Beach Beachers

References

 
Canadian Football League seasons